Frederick Douglas Wakefield (born September 17, 1978) is a former American football guard, tight end, and defensive tackle. He was signed by the Arizona Cardinals as an undrafted free agent in 2001. He played college football at Illinois. Wakefield has also played for the Oakland Raiders.

Career Stats                                

 96 combined tackles                              
 15 tackles for loss
 6.5 sacks
 1 INT
 1 defensive touchdown

External links
Arizona Cardinals bio
Oakland Raiders bio
Pro Football Reference

1978 births
Living people
People from Tuscola, Illinois
American football defensive ends
American football offensive tackles
American football offensive guards
American football tight ends
Illinois Fighting Illini football players
Arizona Cardinals players
Oakland Raiders players